Dejan Despić  (born 11 May 1930) is a Serbian classical composer, author, music theoretician and pedagogue.

Biography 
Despić studied composition with Marko Tajčević and conducting with Mihajlo Vukdragović between 1950 and 1955 at the Music Academy in Belgrade. After his studies, he devoted himself to composing and teaching. From 1956 to 1965 he was teacher at “Mokranjac” music school in Belgrade and from 1956 to 1995 he worked as a Professor at the Belgrade Music Academy (FMU). 
 
Despić is a full member of the Serbian Serbian Academy of Sciences and Arts (SANU).

Despić is the author of more than 240 compositions - with a special penchant for concertante genres and chamber music – and an opera, in addition to several scientific and theoretical studies, and numerous textbooks (music theory, harmony, harmony analysis, orchestration) for both school and university level.

Music
Despić has won many awards for his music; his "Manchester Trio for flute, violoncello, and piano, Op. 93" (1987) – composed specifically for a Manchester performance – and "Diptih, Op. 166, for English horn and chamber orchestra" (2005) – for which he won the "Mokranjac Award" – have been particularly singled out.

References

External links
Official website
Official publisher
Biography at the MIC website
MuzickaCentrala.com (Serbian)
Biography at the website of the Serbian Academy of Sciences and Arts

1930 births
Living people
Musicians from Belgrade
Serbian composers
Serbian musicologists
Academic staff of the University of Arts in Belgrade
University of Arts in Belgrade alumni
Members of the Serbian Academy of Sciences and Arts